John A. Alario, Jr. is an American politician from Louisiana who represented the 8th district in the Louisiana State Senate from 2008 until 2020. Currently a Republican, Alario previously represented District 83 in the Louisiana House of Representatives as a Democrat between 1971 and 2007. Alario was term-limited from the Senate in 2019, and chose not to seek another office.

Alario was the President of the Louisiana State Senate, serving in that role between 2012 and 2020; he is also a former two-term Speaker of the Louisiana House of Representatives. He is the first politician in Louisiana history to hold both roles for two terms each, as well as the longest-serving legislator in state history.

Early career
A graduate of West Jefferson High School and Southeastern Louisiana University, Alario worked as a teacher and accountant prior to entering politics. He has been the owner of John A. Alario, Jr. Tax Income Service since 1972.

Electoral history

Louisiana House of Representatives
Alario was first elected as a Democrat to the Louisiana House of Representatives in 1971, representing the 83rd district in suburban Jefferson Parish.

Speaker of the House
In 1984, Alario was chosen to be Speaker of the Louisiana House of Representatives under Governor Edwin Edwards. He lost that title under Governor Buddy Roemer in 1988, but won it back in 1992 to serve another 4-year term.

Louisiana State Senate
Alario was elected in 2007 to the 6th district in the Louisiana State Senate, defeating Democratic opponent John Roberts 63-37%. In 2010, Alario switched to the Republican Party due to the national direction of the Democratic Party and the increasingly-Republican politics of Louisiana.

Alario was re-elected unopposed in 2011 and 2015. He was term-limited in 2019. Though there was speculation that he would run for his former House of Representatives seat, Alario declined and chose to retire from politics.

Senate President
Alario was chosen as President of the Louisiana State Senate under Governor Bobby Jindal in 2011, and served a second term under Governor John Bel Edwards. He is the second Republican Senate President since Reconstruction.

Personal life
Alario's wife, Alba "Ree" Williamson Alario, died in 2006. The couple had four children – Jan Marie, John, Christopher, and Kevin – and seven grandchildren.

References

External links

|-

|-

1943 births
20th-century American politicians
21st-century American politicians
Living people
Louisiana Democrats
Louisiana Republicans
Louisiana state senators
Members of the Louisiana House of Representatives
People from Westwego, Louisiana
Southeastern Louisiana University alumni
Speakers of the Louisiana House of Representatives